Nestašni dečaci (Wild boys) is a compilation album by Serbian new wave band Bulevar, released by PGP RTS in 2008 as a part of the PGP RTS Retrologija series. The album consists of the remastered versions of the band second single, "Nestašni dečaci" ("Wild boys"), and both studio albums, Loš i mlad (Bad and young) and Mala noćna panika (A little night panic).

Track listing

"Nestašni dečaci"

Loš i mlad

Mala noćna panika

Notes
 Tracks 1 and 2 released on the "Nestašni dečaci" single, released by PGP RTB in 1980.
 Tracks 3 to 12 released on the album Loš i mlad, released by PGP RTB in 1981.
 Tracks 13 to 22 released on the album Mala noćna panika, released by PGP RTB in 1982.

References

External links
Nestašni dečaci at Rateyourmusic

2008 compilation albums
PGP-RTS compilation albums
Bulevar (band) albums